Ivan Isidorovich Nosenko (Russian: Иван Исидорович Носенко; 19 April 1902 – 2 August 1956) was a Soviet politician and from 1939 until his death in 1956. He was the People's Commissar for Shipbuilding of the USSR. He was the father of notable Soviet defector and KGB officer, Yuri Nosenko.

Nosenko was born in the village of Berlevets in Oryol Governorate (in present-day Dubrovsky District, Bryansk Oblast) and joined the Nikolayev Shipyard as a messenger boy in 1914. He became a trade unionist, and after completing military service and graduating from the Nikolayev Shipbuilding Institute, returned to the yard as a manager. Nosenko joined the All-Union Communist Party (b) in 1925. Between 1938 and 1939 he was the managing director of the Baltic Yard in Leningrad. He was appointed Narkom (minister) of shipbuilding in 1940 and was also the 1st deputy commissar of the tank industry during the war. He was elected to the Supreme Soviet in 1954 and between 1954 and 1956 was also head of the Ministry of Medium Machine Building (Atomic Energy)

At his funeral, important leaders of the Soviet Union, including Nikita Khrushchev, Georgi Malenkov, Nikolai Bulganin and Kliment Voroshilov, formed the honor guard. He has been commemorated with a bronze plaque in the Kremlin wall.

Awards 
Order of Lenin - 3 times
Order of Nakhimov 1st class
Order of the Red Banner of Labour
Order of the Red Star
Order of the Badge of Honor

Notes

Further reading
IVAN NOSENKO DIES; SOVIET MINISTER, 54, New York Times, August 4, 1956, Saturday

1902 births
1956 deaths
People from Bryansk Oblast
People from Bryansky Uyezd
Central Committee of the Communist Party of the Soviet Union candidate members
People's commissars and ministers of the Soviet Union
Fourth convocation members of the Soviet of the Union
Recipients of the Order of Lenin
Recipients of the Order of Nakhimov, 1st class